Parricide refers to the deliberate killing of one's own father and mother, spouse (husband or wife), children, and/or close relative. However, the term is sometimes used more generally to refer to the intentional killing of a near relative. It is an umbrella term that can be used to refer to acts of matricide and patricide.

Matricide refers to the deliberate killing of one's own mother. Patricide refers to the deliberate killing of one's own father. The term parricide is also used to refer to many familicides (i.e. family annihilations wherein at least one parent is murdered along with other family members).

Societies consider parricide a serious crime and parricide offenders are subject to criminal prosecution under the homicide laws which are established in places (i.e. countries, states, etc.) in which parricides occur. According to the law, in most countries, an adult who is convicted of parricide faces a long-term prison sentence, a life sentence, or even capital punishment. Youthful parricide offenders who are younger than the age of majority (e.g. 18 year olds in the United States) may be prosecuted under less stringent laws which are designed to take their special needs and development into account but these laws are usually waived and as a result, most youthful parricide offenders are transferred into the Adult Judicial System.

Parricide offenders are typically divided into two categories, 1) youthful parricide offenders (i.e. ages 8–24) and 2) adult parricide offenders (i.e. ages 25 and older) because the motivations and situations surrounding parricide events change as a child matures.

Prevalence 
As per the Parricide Prevention Institute, approximately 2–3% of all U.S. murders were parricides each year since 2010. The more than 300 parricides occurring in just the U.S. each year means there are 6 or more parricide events, on average, each week. This estimate does not include the murders of grandparents or stepparents by a child – only the murders of their natal or legally adoptive parents.

Youthful motives 
Youthful parricide is motivated by a variety of factors. Current research conducted by the Parricide Prevention Institute indicates the top five motives causing a child (aged 8–24 years old) to commit parricide are:
 issues of control - 38% (e.g. put on restriction, phone taken away, etc.);
 issues of money - 10% (access to life insurance, wants money for a party, etc.);
 stop abuse of self or family - 8%;
 fit of anger - 8%;
 wants a different life - 7% (e.g. wants to live with non-custodial parent, etc.).

Child abuse 
It is a common misconception that youthful parricide offenders murdered their parent/s to escape egregious child abuse. This is actually not the case. In fact, this notion was challenged beginning in 1999 when Hillbrand et al. suggested that child abuse is simply only one variable among myriad variables that lead to adolescent parricide, rather than the primary reason for youthful parricide occurrences. In a study published by Weisman et al. (2002), they noted there was a remarkable absence of child abuse and emphatically stated that their research did not statistically validate the generalization that prior child abuse had prompted the majority of these crimes. In 2006 Marleau et al. noted that in their study only 25% of all study participants had been subjected to any kind of family violence; refuting the generalization that child abuse is the primary motivator for parricide by youthful offenders. They called for more research on the alleged connection between child abuse and parricidal acts.  Bourget et al. (2007) noted many shortcomings in the extant literature and suggested alternative causes of parricide rather than accepting a general notion that child abuse was the primary cause of parricide by youthful offenders. In their commentary on methodological problems plaguing parricide research, Hillbrand and Cipriano (2007) noted the challenges posed by studies on parricide; acknowledging that most studies utilized very small sample sizes that should not have been generalized. This call for more research was answered by a study in 2019 when the study by Thompson and Thompson statistically invalidated the general theory that most adolescent parricides were the result of abuse of the child at the hands of the parents who had been murdered. Their research (N = 754) revealed that only 15% of youthful parricide offenders alleged abuse at the hands of the parent/s they had killed. A full 66% were not abused, did not allege abuse and were not perpetrators of abuse. Of the remaining population, 13% of the offenders had alleged abuse that was not substantiated (some of these children had lied about abuse and it could not be proven that abuse had occurred in other cases). Additionally, 6% of the youthful parricide offenders had been found to have actually abused their parent/s prior to the murder/s. Child abuse, while a factor present in some youthful parricide occurrences, is not the primary motivator for these murders. As noted above, issues of control are the most typical motive behind the murder.

Notable modern-day cases 
 Adam Lanza killed his mother before committing the Sandy Hook Elementary School shooting in 2012.
 Kip Kinkel killed his parents before committing the Thurston High School shooting in 1998.
 Joel Michael Guy Jr. killed and dismembered both of his parents on Thanksgiving evening in 2016.
 Charles Whitman killed his mother and his wife before climbing the bell tower at UT-Austin and randomly killing people in 1966. Upon autopsy he was found to have a tumor on his amygdala.
 Dellen Millard killed his father in 2012 and inherited millions. He and his friend Mark Smich worked together as serial killers both before and after the murder; murdering Laura Babcock and Tim Bosma.
 Dana Ewell hired two of his friends to murder his father, mother and sister in 1992. All three were convicted of murder.
 Thomas Bartlett Whitaker killed his mother and his brother (and tried to kill his father but failed) in 2003.
 Lyle and Erik Menendez worked as a team to kill their parents in 1989.
 Sarah Marie Johnson was the only female to kill both of her parents without the help of an accomplice in 2003.
 Suzane von Richthofen killed her father and her mother with the help of her boyfriend and his brother in São Paulo in 2002.
 Nicole Kasinskas killed her mother with the help of her boyfriend in 2003. 
 Chandler Halderson killed and dismembered both of his parents on July 1, 2021. 
 A 19 year old Japanese man in Tosu, Saga Prefecture,  killed and stabbed his parents with a knife. Both of whom had been stabbed in the neck, on March 9, 2023.

Notable historical cases 
 Lizzie Borden (1860–1927) was an American woman accused and acquitted of murdering her father and stepmother.
 Lucius Hostius reportedly was the first parricide in Republican Rome, sometime after the Second Punic War.
 The Criminal Code of Japan once determined that patricide brought capital punishment or life imprisonment. However, the law was abolished because of the trial of the Tochigi patricide case in which a woman killed her father in 1968 after she was sexually abused by him and bore their children.
 Tullia the Younger, along with her husband, arranged the murder and overthrow of Servius Tullius, her father, securing the throne for her husband.
 Mary Blandy (1720–1752) poisoned her father, Francis Blandy, with arsenic in England in 1751.

Legal definition in Roman times
In the sixth century AD collection of earlier juristical sayings, the Digest, a precise enumeration of the victims' possible relations to the parricide is given by the 3rd century AD lawyer Modestinus:

Gallery

See also
 Avunculicide, the killing of one's uncle
 Filicide, the killing of one's child
 Fratricide, the killing of one's brother
 Mariticide, the killing of one's husband
 Nepoticide, the killing of one's nephew
 Patricide, the killing of one's father
 Matricide, the killing of one's mother
 Prolicide, the killing of one's offspring
 Sororicide, the killing of one's sister
 Uxoricide, the killing of one's wife

References

External links

 Dictionary.com entry for parricide
 https://www.parricide.org/

Killings by type
Familicides
Family
Homicide
Domestic violence